Dragomance is a village in the municipality of Staro Nagoričane, North Macedonia.

Demographics
According to the 2002 census, the village had a total of 133 inhabitants. Ethnic groups in the village include:

Macedonians 124
Serbs 9

Notable people
Jovan Grković-Gapon, Serbian Chetnik

References

Villages in Staro Nagoričane Municipality